The Philadelphia Church of God (PCG) is a non-trinitarian, sabbatarian church based in Edmond, Oklahoma, US. The PCG is one of several offshoots of the Worldwide Church of God (WCG), founded by Herbert W. Armstrong (1892–1986). The PCG was established by Gerald Flurry with the stated purpose of continuing Armstrong's teachings, which were re-evaluated and subsequently rejected by the WCG after Armstrong's death, as it came to accept orthodox Christian teachings, such as the Trinity (the triune nature of God as one Being in three distinct Persons).  Armstrong had rejected the Trinity doctrine in favor of the view that God is not one but two separate God-beings (i.e., the God Family or the Family of God) into which Family, according to Armstrong, humans upon true conversion and spiritual growth, may be born.

The PCG asserts that it is carrying on Armstrong's legacy after the doctrinal changes made by the new WCG leaders, namely Joseph W. Tkach and his son, Joseph Tkach Jr., and also teaches new revelation that Flurry claims has been shown by God from the Bible since Armstrong's death.

Founder
Gerald Flurry is Pastor General of the Philadelphia Church of God and Editor-in-Chief of The Philadelphia Trumpet magazine. He is also founder and chairman of the 'Armstrong International Cultural Foundation' and founder and Chancellor of 'Herbert W. Armstrong College' in Edmond, Oklahoma, USA. He was ordained as a minister in 1973, and formerly served as a pastor in the Worldwide Church of God, from which he was disfellowshipped (excommunicated) on December 7, 1989, for resisting sweeping doctrinal changes.  He had alerted the WCG ministry and members of those changes via his booklet Malachi's Message, after which he and his assistant, John Amos, were fired. Flurry then immediately founded his own organization, the Philadelphia Church of God.

History 
The PCG teaches they are the one and original true Church of God and all other churches are apostate or counterfeit. Based on the doctrine of seven church eras, Flurry believes the seven churches in the book of Revelation are descriptive of seven successive eras of God's church from the original apostolic church until the final church that Christ returns to marry. In his book, The True History of God's True Church and it's 2000-Year War with the Great False Church, he attempts to trace his church's history back to the first century church through the Worldwide Church of God, Church of God (Seventh Day), Seventh Day Baptists, Waldensians, Petrobrusians, Paulicians and Bogomils. 

Herbert W. Armstrong founded the Worldwide Church of God in 1934 and led it until his death in 1986. His chosen successor, Joseph Tkach introduced significant doctrinal changes and began to withdraw Armstrong's literature from circulation. He took the church into a more orthodox direction, focusing on Jesus Christ and grace, instead of prophecy and the millennium.  Disturbed by these changes, local minister Gerald Flurry and his assistant, John Amos "seriously questioned WCG leaders' doctrinal changes", resulting in their termination and excommunication. Flurry went on to establish the Philadelphia Church of God in Oklahoma in 1989.

Malachi's Message 
In 1990, Flurry published and started distributing Malachi's Message to the members of the WCG. He claims this book was delivered to him by a "mighty angel" and is the prophesied Little Book found in Revelation 10.  He teaches his followers that it is revelation from God and the centerpiece of God's revelation after Armstrong's death. According to Flurry, the Old Testament prophet Malachi, prophesied over 2,000 years ago that the WCG leadership would make these changes and those who don't follow him are destined for the Great Tribulation. He brands those that won't follow him out of the WCG for being Laodicean - a pejorative he uses to describe their "lukewarm attitude", and warns them of the "nuclear holocaust" that awaits them. He calls those that heed his warning Philadelphians and the "very elect" - those that cannot be deceived, promising them a "headquarters position of rulership" in God's Kingdom.  He assures his followers refuge during the "worst time of suffering" - the Great Tribulation and claims his book, Malachi's Message, is the "ticket to a place of safety".

Mystery of the Ages 
In August 1985, Armstrong's final work, Mystery of the Ages, was published. The WCG described it as a "synopsis of the Bible in the most plain and understandable language". By 1987, the WCG ceased printing the book, citing "biblical discrepancies". In 1997, the PCG decided to reprint Mystery of the Ages and a six-year legal battle over its copyright ensued. While the WCG believed that it was their "Christian duty" to keep Mystery of the Ages out of print, the PCG claimed that God had commissioned them to get the book out to the "largest audience possible". 

In 1999, the District court ruled in favor of the PCG, but was reversed later by the Ninth Circuit Court in 2000. With an injunction to stop printing Mystery of the Ages issued, Flurry appealed to the U.S. Supreme Court and reassured his followers that his court case will be heard before the Supreme Court. A few weeks later, the Supreme Court declined to hear their petition. During the same year, the PCG made different offers to license or purchase some or all of Armstrong's literary works, resulting in an out of court settlement of $3 million for Mystery of the Ages and 18 other works.

Prophecies 
Gerald Flurry is a self-declared prophet (as written in his book Who Is That Prophet). Over three decades, he has made several prophecies, including Donald Trump remaining president, the Supreme Court overturning the 2020 U.S. Election, Barack Obama as the last president of the United States, Pope Benedict XVI will resurrect the Holy Roman Empire, the PCG would acquire the Bricketwood Estate in the UK, and Jesus Christ could return by 2020.

Gerald Flurry as That Prophet 
In 1999, Gerald Flurry declared himself a prophet, specifically That Prophet from John 1:21. In a 2004 sermon, he states "If you just study this book, you'll know who That Prophet is... It does set me apart from other ministers... Is God going to give us something like this that we cannot prove?.. [It is] revelation from God - from outer space - way beyond Mars... If it doesn't, I'm crazy". He claims to speak for God, receiving new revelation from him and even hearing his voice.

Donald Trump as King Jeroboam 
According to his Great Again booklet, Flurry claims that Donald Trump's victory in 2016 was prophesied in the Bible and designates him as King Jeroboam from the Bible. He believed that God revealed to him "that we are in the prophesied 'Jeroboam' end" and there would be "unparalleled carnage and destruction on Earth like never in history!" He also prophesied that Donald Trump would be "taken out by the sword!". He also indicated that Joseph Tkach Jr. would conspire with Donald Trump to send the PCG into exile. He claimed that this is why he appointed so many Catholic supreme court judges during his term. He also predicted the Trump tide, just prior to the COVID-19 pandemic, would be time the PCG would greatly expand their work in Jerusalem. Since none of this happened during his first term, Flurry was confident that Joe Biden winning the 2020 U.S. election was against Bible prophecy and that Trump would remain president. He also noted that Trump's greatest sin was rejecting his throne. For this reason, the United States would be "destroyed in the time of Jeroboam".

Gerald Flurry sits on King David's Throne 
In his book The New Throne of David, Flurry claims he "heard a strong voice... This voice said, "There is a new stone of destiny and a new throne of David." It has always been the belief of the PCG that Queen Elizabeth II is the reigning monarch over David's Throne. He now believes that "in January 2017 that all changed, that throne is no longer in Britain". He claims this is the "most exciting new revelation God has given this Church...this is an explosive understanding that you can prove right from your Bible!" that he sits on a new throne and stone. He also said in his book, on page 22 that "God has to have a king in this Church who is a descendant of David... God has given us a new stone... There is a NEW KING and a NEW STONE... Even now, the United Kingdom NO LONGER HAS THE THRONE OF DAVID. And Jacob's pillar stone is no longer relevant".

Place of Safety 
He wrote in 2018 that the PCG must be "prepared to go to the cave of Adullum, the place of safety. Make this part of your thinking... We must get our minds conditioned to do that!" He explained that there, a converted man in the PCG (a descendant of King David), an "apostle", will sit as a king on a throne. "In the PCG, THERE IS A KING who is led and directed by God!"

Criticisms 
The Philadelphia Church of God has been criticized by the media, religious groups and cult information networks for their unorthodox beliefs and Gerald Flurry's manipulative behavior.

Doomsday Cult 
Recognized by World Religions and Spirituality Project, Christian Apologetics and Research Ministry and Watchman Fellowship as a non-Christian cult which perverts the Bible to its own end. Gerald Flurry is noted as displaying "typical cult-leader arrogance" and creates a "seclusionary atmosphere" for his followers. Flurry's approach to church government has been criticized for being "totalitarian, dictatorial, heavy-handed and tyrannical". Ex-members of the PCG claim that Flurry uses his power to "command absolute obedience" of church members, and threatens their salvation for disobedience. Some members resulting in impoverishment due to the financial demands placed on them and many, including children have died due to inadequate medical treatment. The group was also featured on the podcast The Cult Vault where an ex-member speaks of how members devote their entire lives to their leader Gerald Flurry. Flurry stated "I sometimes feel real good when I'm called a cult..." in a sermon from 1990. The Philadelphia Church of God plans to flee the country in the near future.

The PCG believe that we are entering the most tumultuous period in world history, the terrible time period prophesied to occur just before the Second Coming of Jesus Christ. Flurry believes that God continues to give him new revelation and that he speaks for God. He warns the Laodiceans (followers of Armstrongism that don't adhere to Flurry's teachings), the United States, the nations of the British Commonwealth and Israel of their impending destruction through his Key of David program and various publications. He claims that God is pleading with mankind and that those who don't respond to his message will experience the worst time of suffering ever on this planet!

During the court case against the WCG, cult expert Dr. Ruth Tucker, reported how Flurry's words were often presented to his followers as the very words of God. In her deposition, she asserted that the PCG didn't assess their views against Scripture.  

Nick Winkler of FOX 25 did a special news report (aired on November 24 and 25, 2008) on the PCG, calling out their apocalyptic message and comparing them to David Koresh and the Branch Davidians. Stephen Flurry held a press conference in response to the news report, stating the report was based on innuendo, dishonest and just disgraceful.

Amid the Coronavirus pandemic, British newspaper Express noted that religious fundamentalists such as the PCG have flooded social media with prophecies out of the Book of Revelation. Stephen Flurry joined the chorale of doomsday preachers, citing passages from scripture, which he believes prove the coronavirus is a harbinger of doom. In another 2020 article, Express criticized Gerald Flurry for preaching that according to Bible prophecy, Donald Trump will overturn the election and remain in office.

Malachi's Message 
Malachi's Message is Flurry's explanation of the WCG's departure from Armstrong's teachings. Flurry claims that his book was revealed to him in 1989 as new revelation and a vision from God, that Malachi's Message is more than a human work - it was divinely inspired and delivered by a mighty angel as the Little Book of Revelation 10. Despite these claims, Flurry has released several editions of Malachi's Message with countless edits since its first release in January 1990 - at least five times by the end of 1991. Flurry has significantly expanded the book over the years from 83 pages in 1989 to 156 pages.

In this book, he states that Armstrong fulfilled the prophesied role of "God's end-time Elijah", and the role of "the Man of Sin" was by Joseph Tkach Sr., and after his death, this was changed to Joseph Tkach Jr. Earlier editions indicated that Tkach Sr. will remain alive at the return of Jesus Christ and will be "plucked out of the Great Tribulation". This was later changed to Tkach Jr. after his father's death. The term elect was change to the very elect and references to the Laodicean messenger have been excluded from the book since the 1999 edition.

Jules Dervaes challenged Flurry's copyright on September 26, 1990, citing Flurry's "ideas are a direct and clear plagiarism of his work The Letter to Laodicea", which was published in stages between 1986 and 1988. Both works identifies the Laodicean era, discusses Zerubbabel and Joshua, the betrayal of Zerubbabel, and the man of sin. All ministers, deacons and writers of the WCG were sent a copy of The Letter to Laodicea in 1987 - including Flurry.

Mystery of the Ages 
During Flurry's firing in 1989, then Church Administrator, Tkach Jr. told him that Mystery of the Ages was discontinued because it was "riddled with error". In 1997, the PCG decided to reprint Mystery of the Ages and a six year legal battle over its copyright ensued. Based on the "mystery had to be finished" reference found in Revelation 10 and the "legal language" used in Habakkuk 1, Flurry claimed that victory in court was revealed and prophesied and that Jesus Christ would make a personal appearance in the middle of the court case. He also claimed in That Prophet booklet that he would not lose the court case. WCG Attorney, Ralph Helge stated that Flurry wouldn't want his prophecy to fail and that his words were nothing more than pronouncing his intentions ahead of time.

In 1999, the District court ruled in favor of the PCG, but was reversed later by the Ninth Circuit Court in 2000. With an injunction to stop printing Mystery of the Ages issued, Flurry appealed to the U.S. Supreme Court and reassured his followers that his court case will be heard before the Supreme Court. A few weeks later, the Supreme Court declined to hear their petition. In September 2002, during a Feast of Tabernacles sermon, Flurry stated "the court case is a battle with the devil" and "he would not make a deal with such an evil force - he will only fight." Starting in April 2002, the PCG made different offers to the WCG, and reaching an out of court settlement by January 2003, for 19 of Armstrong's works for $3 million. The PCG has been criticized for misleading their members about the details of the court case to fit their prophetic narrative and caved into making a deal to secure their victory.

The PCG believes that Mystery of the Ages is "God's inspired words", that Armstrong was merely a scribe with "God pouring those words into his mind." They built their court case around its text being divinely inspired and "central to their religious beliefs". Despite criticizing the WCG for revising Mystery of the Ages, they have removed several statements inferring that there are no prophets in the New Testament Church to reconcile the book with their new teaching on the subject. Mystery of the Ages has been updated at least four times since its first release in 1985.

Media projects
The PCG sponsors media projects (including television shows and regular publications) to preach their message and attract new followers to support their organization.

The Key of David
The Key of David is a weekly religious television program hosted by Gerald Flurry, in which he discusses world events and issues from his interpretation of bible prophecies. The program was named out of the Revelation 3:7 and other scriptures connecting it to the letter to the church at Philadelphia. Flurry claims that the Key of David is the "profound understanding Christ wants all of us to have", which will lead to "special positions of authority in New Jerusalem". The commercial-free program is used to promote their literature and is the primary method for attracting new subscribers to their magazine The Philadelphia Trumpet. 

Since 1993, Flurry has produced more than 26 seasons with over 820 episodes recorded. The program is aired in the United States, United Kingdom, Canada, Australia and the Philippines.

On September 17th, 2017, protesters were outside the University of Maryland as The Key of David show had Anti LGBTQ views.

The Philadelphia Trumpet
The Philadelphia Trumpet is the PCG's flagship magazine is published ten times a year and paid for by the tithes and offerings of their members. They claim to "accurately forecast" global events and trends and position the magazine as the successor to the Plain Truth. It serves as their recruitment magazine that is designed to look like a credible news magazine. It is filled with news stories selected and written to fit their prophetic narrative and used to promote their religious ideology. First published in February 1990, the magazine's circulation peaked at 458,700 in 2007 and dropped to 262,346 by 2018 (of which 168,835 was sent out to waiting rooms to attract new readers).

The Trumpet Daily
The Trumpet Daily radio show hosted by the executive editor of The Philadelphia Trumpet Stephen Flurry, speaking on a range of topics including politics, principles of living and bible prophecy. Similar to The Philadelphia Trumpet, this radio program links news events to the PCG's prophetic beliefs. The show premiered on May 9, 2011, and is available through their website, their radio station KPCG and SoundCloud. Previously available on YouTube but restricted since January 2021 due to YouTube's stance to "crackdown on violent criminal organizations".

Celtic Throne 
Their latest dance production follows the millennia-long journey of King David's throne from Judah to the British Isles and eventually, the United States. Created and produced by Herbert W. Armstrong College and Armstrong Dance, with original new music from Golden Globe nominated composer Brian Byrne. In his sermon, Brad Macdonald (PCG minister) states that "Celtic Throne is the United States and Britain in Prophecy performed as a dance show. It's about the "new throne of David". It traces the throne of David on to America". This dance routine is a celebration of Gerald Flurry and his new throne over the United States of America.

Education programs
The PCG offer three education programs to members and their children, with curricular based on their world view and doctrinal teachings.

Herbert W. Armstrong College (AC)
The PCG runs a small unaccredited theology college, Herbert W. Armstrong College, from their headquarters compound in Edmond, Oklahoma. AC offers their church members two-year and four-year liberal arts programs with the objective of teaching students how to live heavily focusing on theology and prophecy. The college acts as a seminary to provide ministers and a pool of entry-level workers for the church's operations.

The college was established in 2001 as "Imperial College of Edmond," but was renamed after objections by Imperial College London. Armstrong College graduated its first class in 2006. In 2015, the PCG opened a second campus at their Edstone mansion in the United Kingdom.

Imperial Academy (IA)
In August 2008, Flurry founded Imperial Academy, a primary and secondary school for the children of church members patterned after the WCG's Imperial Schools. As an unregistered educational institution, Imperial Academy operates independently from local government oversight, providing K-12 education using the A-Beka home schooling curriculum. The church claims that "Imperial teaches young people how to base their learning and thinking on the Holy Bible."

Summer Educational Program (SEP)
Formerly known as Philadelphia Youth Camp (PYC), the PCG sponsors a yearly summer camp modeled after the WCG's Summer Educational Program. Held in Edmond Oklahoma, Edstone England, Australia and the Philippines, campers participate in athletic activities, Bible studies and a wide variety of social and educational activities during the two to three-week camp. It is billeted as an outreach program, exclusive to the teenagers of the church, with the goal of instilling church doctrines and developing unity amongst the teenage membership. According to Flurry, SEP "is a vision of how God will correct the problems of the entire world", it helps their "young people turn to God" and to prepare them for "the return of Christ".

Outreach activities 
The PCG runs various outreach activities aimed improving their public image and promoting Flurry's teachings to the world.

Armstrong International Cultural Foundation (AICF)
Armstrong International Cultural Foundation was established in 1996 as The Philadelphia Foundation. The AICF sponsors a performing arts concert series and archaeological digs in Israel. Armstrong Auditorium, located on the Herbert W. Armstrong College campus in Edmond, opened in September 2010. The auditorium architecture was designed with Ambassador Auditorium in mind. Armstrong Auditorium hosts the AICF's performing arts concert series and occasionally, archaeological exhibits.

Armstrong Institute of Biblical Archaeology (AIBA) 
Founded in January 2022, Armstrong Institute of Biblical Archaeology is the church's archaeological institution based in Jerusalem, Israel. With a stated mission to showcase Israel's biblical archaeology to the world, AIBA sponsors and participates in archaeological excavations in the City of David and on the Ophel. Originally, Flurry planned to call this institution, Armstrong-Mazar Institute of Biblical Archaeology in honour of Herbert W. Armstrong and archaeologists Professor Benjamin Mazar and grand daughter Dr. Eilat Mazar. The PCG has been involved in several phases of Dr. Mazar's excavations in Jerusalem since 2006. 

Flurry says the spirit of secularism and intellectualism has crept into the field of biblical archaeology. He has set up AIBA to promote the Bible as a credible and essential historical source in the practice of archaeology in Israel. He believes that AIBA fulfils a prophecy in Isaiah 40:9, whereby he will "get up into the high mountain" to proclaim his message to Israel.

See also 
Armstrongism
Herbert W. Armstrong
Grace Communion International
Church of God (Seventh Day)

References

External links 
 
 
 
 
 

Church of God (Armstrong)
Church of God denominations
Edmond, Oklahoma